The women's 200 metres event at the 1986 Commonwealth Games was held on 28 and 31 July at the Meadowbank Stadium in Edinburgh.

Medalists

Results

Heats
Qualification: First 3 of each heat (Q) and the next 2 fastest (q) qualified for the final.

Wind:Heat 1: +1.1 m/s, Heat 2: +0.3 m/s

Final
Wind: +2.1 m/s

References

Athletics at the 1986 Commonwealth Games
1986